Ship in Distress is a 1929 German silent drama film directed by Carmine Gallone and starring Liane Haid,  Alfons Fryland, and Gina Manès.

The film's sets were designed by Heinz Fenchel and Jacek Rotmil. It was distributed by the German branch of First National Pictures.

Cast

References

Bibliography

External links

1929 films
Films of the Weimar Republic
German silent feature films
Films directed by Carmine Gallone
Seafaring films
German black-and-white films
German drama films
1929 drama films
Silent drama films
Silent adventure films
1920s German films